Denise was an Australian morning show television series that aired on the Seven Network from 1998 until 2001. It was hosted by Denise Drysdale.

Seven Network original programming
Australian variety television shows
1998 Australian television series debuts
2001 Australian television series endings
Television shows set in Victoria (Australia)
English-language television shows